Engene Church is a parish church of the Church of Norway in Arendal Municipality in Agder county, Norway. It is located in the village of Nedenes. It is one of the churches for the Øyestad parish which is part of the Arendal prosti (deanery) in the Diocese of Agder og Telemark. The white, wooden church was built in a long church design in 1882 using plans originally drawn up by the architect Wilhelm Hanstein. The church seats about 480 people.

History

The church was first built in the town of Grimstad in 1849 using designs by the architect Wilhelm Hanstein where it was called Grimstad Church. It was likely the first church built in Southern Norway in the Swiss chalet style. The church has a large distinctive tower above the main entrance.

In 1881, the town had grown and the church was too small, so it was disassembled and moved to the nearby village of Nedenes and rebuilt there in 1882 as the new "Nedenesengene Church", but it was later shortened to simply "Engene Church". In 1990, the interior was repainted a gray-violet color following the recommendations from the National Heritage Board since it is believed those were the original colors of the church's interior.

See also
List of churches in Agder og Telemark

References

Buildings and structures in Arendal
Churches in Agder
Wooden churches in Norway
19th-century Church of Norway church buildings
Churches completed in 1849
1881 establishments in Norway